Kill My Landlord is the debut studio album by American hip hop group The Coup. It was released on Wild Pitch Records on May 4, 1993. It peaked at number 83 on the Billboard Top R&B Albums chart.

Track listing

Charts

References

External links
 

1993 debut albums
The Coup albums
Wild Pitch Records albums